Javed Jais Khan (born 20 October 1990) is an Indian first-class cricketer who played for Mumbai in domestic cricket between 2010 and 2015. He is a right-arm medium-fast bowler. He was picked by the Mumbai Indians for IPL 2013, though he did not end up playing any games for them.

References

External links
 

Living people
1990 births
Indian cricketers
Mumbai cricketers
Mumbai Indians cricketers